Jai Jagadish (born 29 June 1954) is an Indian actor, director and producer in the Kannada film industry. Starting his career as an actor in Phalitamsha (1976), he went on to feature in over 300 films as an actor. In 1998, he turned producer for the film Bhoomi Thayiya Chochchala Maga. His debut directorial film was Madana. Some of the notable films of Jai Jagadish as an actor include Gaali Maathu (1981), Benkiyalli Aralida Hoovu (1983), Bandhana (1984), Madhuve Madu Tamashe Nodu (1986) and Garjane (1981), among others. His film Kothigalu Saar Kothigalu won the Filmfare Award for Best film.
He is the President of Wakayama Karate-Do India.

Personal life 
He divorced his first wife  Roopa and the custody of his daughter Arpitha  was given to his wife Roopa.

Filmography

 Phalitamsha (1976)
 Paduvaaralli Pandavaru (1978)
 Aarada Gaaya (1980)
 Biligiriya Banadalli (1980)
 Point Parimala (1980)
 Bhagyavantha (1981)
 Preetisi Nodu (1981)
 Garjane (1981)
 Gaali Maathu (1981)
 Prema Pallavi (1981)
 Ajith (1982)
 Mullina Gulabi (1982)
 Benkiyalli Aralida Hoovu (1983)
 Dharani Mandala Madhyadolage (1983)
 Samarpane (1983)
 Bandhana (1984)
 Pralayanthaka (1984)
 Baddi Bangaramma (1984)
 Huli Hejje (1984)
 Benki Birugali (1984)
 Naane Raja (1984)
 Madhuve Madu Tamashe Nodu (1984)
 Pithamaha (1985)
 Guri (1986)
 Manithanin Marupakkam (1986) - Tamil film
 Mandhira Punnagai (1986) - Tamil film
 Aaseya Bale (1987)
 Mathrudevobhava (1988)
 Ranadheera (1988)
 Thayigobba Tharle Maga (1989)
 Rani Maharani (1990)
 Policena Hendthi (1990)
 Kalla Malla (1991)
 Rowdy & MLA (1991)
 Mannina Doni (1992)
 Nagaradalli Nayakaru (1992)
 Prema Sangama (1992)
 Hoovu Hannu (1993)
 Chikkejamanru (1993)
 Gandugali (1994)
 Himapatha (1995)
 Samara (1995)
 Mana Midiyithu (1995)
 Karulina Kudi (1995)
 Mungarina Minchu (1997)
 Bhoomi Thayiya Chochchala Maga (1998)
 O Premave (1999)
 Hagalu Vesha (2000)
 Kothigalu Saar Kothigalu (2001)
 Majestic (2002)
 Don (2003)
 Katthegalu Saar Katthegalu (2003)
 Love (2004)
 Kanchana Ganga (2004)
 Aadi (2005)
 Swamy (2005)
 Madana (2006) - also director
 Mungaru Male (2006)
 Ee Bandhana (2007)
 Moggina Manasu (2008)
 Love Guru (2009)
 Male Barali Manju Irali (2009)
 Crazy Kutumba (2010)
 Thamassu (2010)
 Krishnan Marriage Story (2011)
 Sanju Weds Geetha (2011)
 Kemepegowda (2011)
 Ondu Kshanadalli (2012)
 Gokula Krishna (2012)
 Ambara (2013)
 Aane Pataaki (2013)
 Barfi (2013)
 Sweety Nanna Jodi (2013)
 Brindavana (2013)
 Varadhanayaka (2013)
 Dashamukha (2013)
 Myna (2013)
 Bachchan (2013)
 Angaaraka (2014)
 Bahaddur (2014)
 Ugramm (2014)
 Dilwala (2014)
 Drishya (2014)
 Brahma (2014)
 Power (2014)
 Simhadri (2014)
 Shutterdulai (2016) - Tulu
 March 22 (2016)
 Ambi Ning Vayassaytho (2018)
 Viraaj (2018)
 Missing boy (2018)
 I Love You (2019)

Television
Aramane (2016–2018)
Sanju Mattu Naanu (2017)
Kasthuri Nivasa (2019–2020)
Jothe Jotheyali (2022)

References

External links

 Biography of Jai Jagadish 

1954 births
Living people
Male actors in Kannada cinema
Indian male film actors
Kannada film directors
Kannada film producers
Filmfare Awards South winners
Male actors from Karnataka
20th-century Indian male actors
21st-century Indian male actors
Film producers from Karnataka
Film directors from Karnataka
21st-century Indian film directors
Recipients of the Rajyotsava Award 2018